Hot Sweet Ass is Tom Rhodes' debut live album.  It was recorded at the Laff Stop in Houston, Texas.

Track listing 
 "Where I'm From and What I've Seen"
 "The Power of Love"
 "Magnificent Sunrises"
 "I Love Everything Mexican"
 "Cowboys and Cadillacs"
 "Arm the Teachers"
 "Mix the Races"
 "Random Voodoo"
 "Adventures of a Comedian"
 "Amsterdam Epiphanies"
 "Gargantuan Advice"
 "Every Man's Secret"

References

Tom Rhodes albums
2005 live albums
Stand Up! Records live albums
2000s comedy albums